Edward James Finucane (1916-1991) was an Australian rugby league footballer who played in the 1930s.

Playing career
Finucane played three seasons with South Sydney Rabbitohs between 1935 and 1937. He played in the Souths losing Grand Final team of 1935.  

In 1937, Finucane joined North Sydney and played 2 games for the club.

Finucane died on 24 February 1991, 40 days short of his 75th birthday.

References

1916 births
1991 deaths
South Sydney Rabbitohs players
Australian rugby league players
Place of birth missing
North Sydney Bears players
Rugby league players from Sydney
Rugby league wingers
Rugby league centres